Frank Yablans (August 27, 1935 – November 27, 2014) was an American studio executive, film producer, and screenwriter. Yablans served as an executive at Paramount Pictures, including President of the studio, in the 1960s and 70s. As a filmmaker, he is best known for writing and producing the film Mommie Dearest (1981), which was nominated for nine Razzies at the 2nd Golden Raspberry Awards, including "winning" Worst Picture and Worst Screenplay for Yablans.

Early life 
Frank Yablans was born in Brooklyn, New York to Annette and Morris Yablans. Frank Yablans' father was a taxi driver. His older brother is film producer Irwin Yablans of Halloween (1978) fame. Frank Yablans was Jewish.

Career 
Yablans entered the motion picture business in 1956 joining Warner Bros. sales. In 1959, he joined Buena Vista as the Milwaukee sales manager where he stayed until 1966. He joined Sigma III and later transitioned to Filmways after it acquired Sigma III.

He became executive vice president of sales for Paramount Pictures in June 1969. In the position his expert marketing of the film Love Story (1970), led to his appointment as Paramount Studios' president on May 10, 1971.

As head of Paramount, he oversaw the release and marketing of The Godfather (1972), The Godfather Part II (1974), and Chinatown (1974). He also personally supervised the 100th birthday celebrations of studio founder Adolph Zukor in January 1973.

After a reorganization at Paramount in which Charles Bluhdorn, the chairman and CEO of Gulf & Western Industries, was replaced by Barry Diller, Yablans announced his resignation as president on November 8, 1974.

After leaving Paramount he became an independent producer, working primarily through Paramount and 20th Century Fox. He was executive producer of Silver Streak (1976), The Other Side of Midnight (1977), Congo (1995), and the popular HBO series "Rome." He also produced and adapted the screenplays for North Dallas Forty (1979) and Mommie Dearest (1981) which were both based on books; the latter won a Golden Raspberry Award for Worst Screenplay.

Yablans was recruited by Kirk Kerkorian to head his troubled and debt-laden film company Metro-Goldwyn-Mayer (MGM). While Yablans' reorganization of MGM and United Artists (UA) into a single entity as MGM/UA served to reduce costs and overhead, the company continued to lose value, and in 1986, was purchased by Ted Turner Productions for a reported $1.25 billion. During the time he left MGM, he formed Northstar Entertainment Corporation, with a partnership at Producers Sales Organization. In 1986, he had set up a two-year, seven-picture agreement with low-budget B-movie studio Empire International in order to produce feature films by early 1987. In 1987, director Arthur Seidelman partnered a non-exclusive association with Yablans to produce feature films.

In 2003, Yablans and partners Cindy Bond, Charlie Stuart Gay and Ron Booth founded Promenade Pictures, a production and marketing company committed to "family-friendly" entertainment, with its most ambitious project the "Epic Stories of the Bible" series of CGI-animated features, inaugurated with The Ten Commandments (2007) and Noah's Ark: The New Beginning (2012).

Death 
Yablans died on Thanksgiving, November 27, 2014, from natural causes at the age of 79. He had three children–Robert Yablans (deceased), Sharon Abrams, and Edward Yablans–and his long-time companion was Nadia Pandolfo.

References

External links
 

1935 births
2014 deaths
American male screenwriters
Jewish American screenwriters
American film studio executives
Paramount Pictures executives
Metro-Goldwyn-Mayer executives
Warner Bros. people
21st-century American Jews
Presidents of Paramount Pictures